is a Japanese voice actress who is affiliated with Sony Music Artists. She made her entertainment debut in 2018, and in 2021 she played her first main anime role as Rena Hananoi in the series Selection Project.

Career
Mizuno was born on September 29, 1999. She started entertainment activities after being a finalist at an audition in 2016. She started a YouTube channel in 2018. In 2020 she played the role of Akira Hirose in the mobile game Baton Relay.

Mizuno played her first main role in an anime in 2021, voicing Rena Hananoi in Selection Project. The following year, she was cast as Ryō Yamada in Bocchi the Rock! and Liu Shouxue in Raven of the Inner Palace.

In 2022, Mizuno became a member of Seiyū E-Sports-bu, a group of voice actors who stream games on YouTube and do various gaming-related activities.

Filmography

Anime
2021
Osamake, Young Girl (episode 12)
Selection Project, Rena Hananoi

2022
The Genius Prince's Guide to Raising a Nation Out of Debt, Server (episode 9)
Bocchi the Rock!, Ryō Yamada
Raven of the Inner Palace, Liu Shouxue

Games
2020
Baton Relay, Akira Hirose
Monster Strike, Saku Kogiri

References

External links
 

1999 births
Japanese voice actresses
Living people